Peter Elliott may refer to:

 Peter Elliott (actor) (born ), New Zealand actor
 Peter Elliott (American football) or Pete Elliott (1926–2013), American football coach
 Peter Elliott (architect) (born 1950), Australian architect
 Peter Elliott (athlete) (born 1962), English middle-distance runner 
 Peter Elliott (bishop) (born 1943), Australian Roman Catholic auxiliary bishop of Melbourne
 Peter Elliott (British actor) (born 1956), actor specializing in ape roles
 Peter Elliott (Canadian priest) (born 1954), Anglican dean of New Westminster
 Peter Elliott (English priest) (born 1941), Anglican archdeacon of Northumberland
 Peter Elliott (pharmacologist) (born 1958), British pharmacologist
 Peter D. T. A. Elliott (born 1941), American mathematician
 Peter J. Elliott (1930–2016), British actor, stunt performer, singer, and diver

See also 
 Peter Eliot (1910–1995), English Anglican archdeacon of Worcester